The US Yachts US 22 is an American trailerable sailboat, that was designed by Gary Mull and first built in 1979.

The US 22 is a development of the 1977 Ranger 22 and the Buccaneer 220 of 1978, both Mull designs. The US 22 design was later developed into the Triton 22 and built by Pearson Yachts starting in 1985.

Production
The boat was built by US Yachts, a division of Bayliner, which is itself a division of the Brunswick Boat Group, which is in turn owned by the Brunswick Corporation. The design was constructed starting in 1979, but it is now out of production.

Design

The US 22 is a small recreational keelboat, built predominantly of hand-laid fiberglass, with teak wood trim. It has a fractional sloop rig with aluminum spars, a raked stem and reverse transom, a transom-hung rudder controlled by a tiller.

It displaces  and carries  of ballast. The boat was factory-built with three different types of fin keels: a conventional fixed keel, a fixed shoal-draft keel and a retractable swing keel.

The boat is normally fitted with a small  outboard motor for docking and maneuvering.

The design has sleeping accommodation for five people, with a double "V"-berth in the bow, a drop-down dinette table on the port side that forms a double berth and a single quarter berth on the starboard side that extends under the cockpit. The galley is located on the starboard side just forward of the companionway steps. The galley is equipped with an optional two-burner alcohol-fired stove, a single sink with hand-pumped water supply and a portable icebox. The optional head is located in the bow cabin on the port side under the forward section of the "V" berth and consists of a portable toilet. The cabin sole is teak and holly. Ventilation is provided by a hatch over the bow cabin.

For sailing the boat is equipped with a mainsheet traveler mounted on the bridge deck, genoa tracks, an internally-mounted outhaul, topping lift and reefing system. There are two cockpit winches for the jib. The boat may be fitted with a spinnaker for downwind sailing.

Variants
US 22
It has a PHRF racing average handicap of 282.
US 22 SD
The boat has a PHRF racing average handicap of 264.
US 22 Swing Keel

Operational history
In a 2010 review Steve Henkel noted the wide four seat dinette table, which can be converted into a double berth. He listed the full keel version's worst features, in comparison to its competition, as, "the draft is a little high, the ballast a little low, and the headroom low, too."

See also

List of sailing boat types
Related development
US Yachts US 25
Similar sailboats
Alberg 22
Cape Dory 22
Capri 22
Catalina 22
CS 22
DS-22
Edel 665
Falmouth Cutter 22
Hunter 22
J/22
Marlow-Hunter 22
Marshall 22
Nonsuch 22
Pearson Electra
Pearson Ensign
Santana 22
Seaward 22
Spindrift 22
Starwind 223
Tanzer 22

References

External links

Keelboats
1970s sailboat type designs
Sailing yachts
Trailer sailers
Sailboat type designs by Gary Mull
Sailboat types built by US Yachts